Kensuke Fukuda (福田 健介, born 24 July 1984 in Shizuoka) is a Japanese football player who plays for Ococias Kyoto AC.

Club career statistics
Updated to 23 February 2017.

References

External links

Profile at Ventforet Kofu
Profile at V-Varen Nagasaki

1984 births
Living people
Meiji University alumni
Association football people from Kanagawa Prefecture
Japanese footballers
J1 League players
J2 League players
Tokyo Verdy players
Ventforet Kofu players
V-Varen Nagasaki players
Tochigi SC players
Ococias Kyoto AC players
Association football defenders